Terasakiella is a genus of bacteria from the order Rhodospirillales.

References

Further reading 
 
 

Rhodospirillales
Bacteria genera